Estádio Durival Britto e Silva, better known as Estádio Vila Capanema (Portuguese for Capanema Borough Stadium), is the main stadium of Paraná Clube in Curitiba, Paraná, Brazil. The other stadium is Estádio Vila Olímpica, currently being used for training. The stadium holds 20,000 people. It is named after Colonel Durival Britto e Silva, who was president of the RFFSA, the Brazilian Federal railroad company.

History
It was built in 1947 as the home stadium of Clube Atlético Ferroviário. The first match was played there on January 23 of that year, when Fluminense Football Club from Rio de Janeiro beat Clube Atlético Ferroviário 5-1; the first goal scored by Fluminense's Careca.

During many years Estádio Vila Capanema was Curitiba's most modern and comfortable stadium with a capacity of 15,000 spectators. It was used for the 1950 FIFA World Cup games. On June 25, 1950, Spain beat the United States of America and in the 29th day of that month, Paraguay played against Sweden.

Clube Atlético Ferroviário ceased operation in 1971 and Vila Capanema became Paraná Clube's home since the foundation of the club in 1989.

In 2006, Estádio Vila Capanema was modernized and Paraná Clube opened the stadium again after four years. The capacity of the stadium was boosted to 20,083 fans. The American rock band Pearl Jam played at the stadium on November 9, 2011, as part of their 20th anniversary tour.

References

 Official website
 Especial Placar - Guia 2006 Brasileirão - São Paulo: Editora Abril, 2006.
 Enciclopédia do Futebol Brasileiro, Volume 2 - Lance, Rio de Janeiro: Aretê Editorial S/A, 2001.

External links
Official Site

Vila Capanema
Vila Capanema
Vila Capanema
Sport in Curitiba
Sports venues in Paraná (state)